Teeny Little Super Guy was an animated short featured on PBS's Sesame Street. The shorts featured a small animated man, the Teeny Little Super Guy, who resides in a live-action, regular-sized kitchen. He is a small, bald man who wears a yellow hat, a yellow long-sleeved shirt, red pants and black shoes.  He also lives attached to a clear plastic cup.  Robert W. Morrow described the shorts as including "parables of childhood conflict and striving."

Background
Teeny Little Super Guy (TLSG) was created by animator Paul Fierlinger as a series of 13 installments for PBS's Sesame Street in 1982. The first Teeny Little Super Guy cartoon took two months to create. The series of segments were frequently shown on Sesame Street for several years. However, in the late 1990s the segments were shown sporadically (eventually not appearing on the show at all from 1997 to 2000). The segments reappeared briefly on Sesame Street in 2001 and a short clip (a part of the theme song only) was shown on Sesame Street's 35th anniversary special, The Street We Live On (2004). The shorts have not appeared on Sesame Street since that time in 2002–present.

Production
The production for Teeny Little Super Guy started in May 1982 with Paul Fierlinger, Larry Gold, Jim Thurman, Tom Sloan, Stuart Horn, Ondre Oceanas, and Edith Zornow. In August 1982, the production for the shorts developed more seriously into filming the first two shorts. On February 17, 1984, the first short premiered on Sesame Street. Composer Larry Gold wrote the theme song, with lyrics by Stuart Horn.  Actor and longtime Sesame Street writer Jim Thurman performed all character voices. The production started filming in Philadelphia, Pennsylvania at Paul Fierlinger's house in the Philadelphia suburbs. It ran periodically on Sesame Street from 1984 until 2001.

, one of the Teeny Little Super Guy cups, along with a picture of Fierlinger rotating the cups, was inside the public display case at the Brooklyn Public Library along with the other Sesame Street contributors. The display also includes another picture of the character with a yellow balloon. The plaque at the library mentions that "Teeny Little Super Guy," an instant hit two seasons later in 1984, was shot by stop-motion filmmaker Fierlinger using common household objects. Most of the animation was done by Tom Sloan along with Ondre Ocenas and Helena Fierlinger. In Episode 4196 of Sesame Street, Luis was inspecting Leela's troubled washing machine. He managed to extract seven items, including the famous Teeny Little Super Guy.

The filming was done primarily in Fierlinger's house and his studio next door. It was filmed using a 16mm Bolex with an electric motor drive giving a shutter speed of about 1/6 of a second. This allowed for higher f-stops and therefore having the 3D objects to be in better focus. Some of the scenes used early video assist to see how the scene looked on a TV monitor.

Segments

Cast

Voices
Jim Thurman performed all voices for the short

Music
Theme and all incidental music - Larry Gold
Theme vocals - Essra Mohawk
The voice of the Teeny Little Super Guy - Jim Thurman
Lyrics - Stuart Horn

References

External links

Background on Teeny Little Super Guy
Teeny Little Super Guy LiveJournal Community
Details on the production, by Paul Fierlinger
"Baseball game" and "Cooperation Swing" episodes on Sesame Street's YouTube channel

Sesame Street characters
Sesame Street segments
1980s English-language films